Radkevich is a surname and may refer to:

Evgeny Aleksandrovich Radkevich (died 1930), Russian and Soviet general
Nikolay Radkevich (1888–1916), serial killer
Svetlana Radkevich (born 1979), Belarusian speed skater
Vladimir Radkevich (born 1976), UzbekistanI-Kyrgyz football player and coach